Prinz is a German title that translates into English as "prince", see also Fürst (sovereign prince).

Prinz may also refer to:
 Prinz (brand), a brand formerly used by the British photographic and electronics retail chain, Dixons
 NSU Prinz, automobile produced in West Germany by NSU Motorenwerke AG from 1957 to 1973
 Prinz (crater), an impact crater on the Moon

People
 Alfred Prinz (1930-2014), Austrian composer
 Birgit Prinz (born 1977), German retired footballer
 Bret Prinz (born 1977), American baseball player
 Dietrich Prinz (1903-1989), German computer scientist
 Günter Prinz (1929-2020), German newspaper journalist
 Jesse Prinz, American professor
 Joachim Prinz (1902-1988), American-German rabbi
 LeRoy Prinz (1895-1983), American choreographer
 Matthias Prinz (born 1956), German lawyer
 Nina Prinz (born 1982), German motorcycle racer
 Rosemary Prinz (born 1930), American television actress
 Thomas Prinz (born 1959), German ambassador
 Wolfgang Prinz (born 1942), German psychologist

See also
 Prince (disambiguation)
 Prinze (surname)

German-language surnames